"The Woman with You" is a song written by David Frasier and Craig Wiseman and recorded by American country music artist Kenny Chesney.  It was released in August 2004 as the fourth single from Chesney’s 2004 album When the Sun Goes Down. The song peaked at number 2 on the U.S. Billboard Hot Country Singles & Tracks chart in 2004.

Content
The narrator's wife reflects on her dreams of making it big in the corporate world while in reality she works menial jobs with little appreciation. She then tells him that "it sure is nice to just be the woman with you".

Chart positions
"The Woman with You" debuted at number 54 on the U.S. Billboard Hot Country Songs chart for the week of September 4, 2004.

References

2004 singles
2004 songs
Kenny Chesney songs
Songs written by Craig Wiseman
Song recordings produced by Buddy Cannon
BNA Records singles
Songs written by David Frasier